Tarick Salmaci (born February 28, 1972) is a Lebanese-American former professional boxer and North American Boxing Organization (NABO) middleweight champion. He was one of 16 boxers chosen worldwide to participate on season 1 of NBC's reality television series The Contender.

Boxing

Amateur career 
Salmaci began his boxing career at the age of 8 at Kronk Gym in Detroit. He compiled an amateur record of 136-12, and earned a spot in the Olympic Trials where he fought his way to the finals, just missing the U.S. Olympic team.

Professional career 
Salmaci turned professional after the Olympic Trials and signed with manager Jackie Kallen.

Salmaci won the North American Boxing Organization's super middleweight title on March 11, 1997 in Phoenix, Arizona. He then signed to fight Joe Calzaghe for the WBO super middleweight championship but pulled out of the fight after a dispute with his management.

Salmaci won his first eighteen professional bouts and finished his career in May 2005 with an overall record of nineteen wins and three losses.

Acting 
In the first season of NBC's reality show The Contender, Salmaci was one of 16 fighters chosen worldwide to participate on the show, Although Salmaci lost in the first round of the show's tournament, he was voted back as a "fan favorite" to fight once more.

Personal life 
Salmaci has a Bachelor of Arts degree from the University of Michigan. He also invests in real estate development. He is married and has one daughter.

Professional boxing record

References

External links 

1972 births
Living people
American people of Lebanese descent
The Contender (TV series) participants
Boxers from Michigan
Sportspeople from Dearborn, Michigan
American male boxers
University of Michigan alumni
Middleweight boxers
Sportspeople of Lebanese descent